Mohanpur is an Upazila of Rajshahi District in the Division of Rajshahi, Bangladesh.

Geography
It is 25 km away from Rajshahi district headquarter. It has 43984 households and a total area of 162.65 km2. The Postal Code is 6220.It is surrounded by Tanore Upazila of Rajshahi District and Manda Upazila of Naogaon District to the north, Bagmara Upazila to the east, Paba Upazila and Durgapur Upazila to the south, Tanore Upazila to the west.

History
Mohanpur Thana was formed in 1917 and it was turned into an upazila in 1983.

Independence War
The local razakars established a camp in a madrasa at village Sankoa and conducted mass torture to the families of freedom fighters and other innocent people of the nearby locality. The razakars killed freedom fighter Abdul Aziz in his residence at village Bihatra; they also sacked his house. In November the freedom fighters launched an attack on the razakar camp and killed six razakars.

Demographics
According to the 2011 Bangladesh census, Mohanpur has a population of 1,70,021 (males 85,236 and females 84,785). Males constitute 50.13% of the population, and females 49.87%, Male and Female ratio is 101:100.Population density is 1045/km2. Mohanpur has an average literacy rate of 51.3%(males 55.3% and Females 47.2%) (7+ years). According to religion Muslims are 164797(96.93%), Hindus 4314 (2.54%),  Christians 334 (0.19%), Buddhists 0(0%), Others 576 (0.34%).There are 402 mosques, 117 Eid-gahs, 24 temples.

Administration
Mohanpur Upazila is divided into Kesharhat Municipality and six union parishads: Bakshimail, Dhurail, Ghasigram, Jahanabad, Maugachhi, and Rayghati. The union parishads are subdivided into 167 mauzas and 138 villages.

Education
The Literacy Rate of Mohanpur upazila is 51.3%(males 55.3% and Females 47.2%) (7+ years). There are 82 primary schools, 52 high/junior-high schools (2 government school), 21 colleges and 21 madrasas.

Economy
The economy of Rajshahi is predominantly agricultural. The main crops of this sub-district are Paddy, wheat, jute, sugarcane, turmeric, oil seed, onion, garlic, potato, betel leaf. Betel leaf of this area is very much famous in all over the country
The main fruits produced in the region are mango, jack-fruit, banana, litchi, black berry, coconut, palm, kul, guava and papaya. Rice is the staple food of the people of this area.

See also
Upazilas of Bangladesh
Districts of Bangladesh
Divisions of Bangladesh

References

External links
 Website of upazila administration
 Mohanpur Upazila in Banglapedia

Upazilas of Rajshahi District